Saks, Inc. (originally Proffitt's, Inc.) was an American holding company founded in 1919. Before acquisition by the Canadian-founded Hudson's Bay Company in 2013, it held ownership of department store chains including New York City-based Saks Fifth Avenue (1998–2013) and Tennessee-based Proffitt's (1919–2005). It acquired several mid-range department store chains in the 1990s, however, refocused on upscale retailing and divested of them in the mid-2000s.

HBC maintains the Saks Fifth Avenue nameplate through the full-line department stores, Saks Off 5th off-price stores, and SaksWorks coworking space provider.

Operations during 20th century 
Proffitt's Inc. began as five Proffitt's stores in the Knoxville, Tennessee, metropolitan  area. After going public under the symbol PRFT on the NASDAQ stock exchange in 1987, Proffitt's Inc. grew by acquiring several department stores.  In 1989 the company purchased 18 Hess's locations in Tennessee, Virginia, Kentucky, and Georgia. From 1994 to 1998, the company added McRae's, Younkers, Parisian, Herberger's, Carson Pirie Scott, the Wisconsin-based Boston Store chain, and Bergner's chains, as well as additional stores from Loveman's, Parks-Belk, and Brody's, which were converted into existing store nameplates. After acquiring Parisian, Proffitt's relocated its corporate headquarters to Birmingham, Alabama, from Knoxville in October 1997. Although the full Saks company no longer has a store in Mississippi, Saks operates its data services from the former McRae's headquarters in Jackson, Mississippi.

1998 acquisition of Saks Holdings 
In September 1998, the company acquired the holding company for the luxury retailer Saks Fifth Avenue, Saks Holdings, Inc., and subsequently changed its legal name to Saks, Incorporated. The acquisition brought the Saks Fifth Avenue and Off 5th franchises, as well as Folio, a mail-order business and Saks.com, an online retailer.

The former Saks Fifth Avenue properties became the Saks Fifth Avenue Enterprises division of the company with the larger Birmingham-based department store division becoming the Saks Department Store Group. The company's main-line department store group was made up of its Southern Department Store Group: McRae's and Proffitt's, the Northern Department Store Group: Bergner's, Boston Store, Carson Pirie Scott, Herberger's and Younkers, the company's Specialty Department Store Group Parisian, and the company's Saks Fifth Avenue Enterprises which included Saks Fifth Avenue and Off 5th.

Operations during 21st century 
In 2001, the company recorded record revenues of $6.6 billion, making it a member of the Fortune 500 and one of the largest operators of department stores in the United States. The company was also a primary sponsor of the Bruno's Memorial Classic golf tournament, now known as the Regions Charity Classic.  The company moved its headquarters to Midtown Manhattan, New York City in 2007.

In 2005, vendors filed against Saks alleging unlawful chargebacks. The U.S. Securities and Exchange Commission (SEC) investigated the complaint for  years, and according to the New York Times "exposed a tangle of illicit tactics that let Saks ... keep money it owed to clothing makers", inflating Saks' yearly earnings up to 43% and abusively collecting around $30 million from suppliers over seven years. Saks settled with the SEC in 2007, after firing three or more executives involved in the fraudulent activities. In March, 2005, Saks announced to restate financial results from fiscal 1999 through the third quarter of fiscal 2004 to correct some accounting errors related to its previously recorded operating leases.

By 2005, Saks Incorporated began to seek a narrower focus towards the luxury-oriented retail synonymous with its Saks Fifth Avenue stores.  The decision resulted in a July 2005 sale of its combined 47 Proffitt's and McRae's stores to Belk for approximately $622 million.

On October 31 that same year,  Saks announced that it was selling the 142 stores within its Northern Department Store Group, including Carson Pirie Scott, Bergner's, Younkers, Herberger's, and Boston Store to Bon-Ton Stores, Inc., for $1.1 billion; the transaction was complete as of March 6, 2006.

On August 2, 2006, Saks Incorporated announced that it had agreed to sell its upscale 38 Parisian stores, along with two regional distribution centers and Birmingham corporate headquarters to Belk, which rebranded them under their own name in the third quarter of 2007.

On November 5, 2008, Saks announced the closure of the unprofitable Club Libby Lu chain.

2013 acquisition by Hudson's Bay Company 
On July 29, 2013, Toronto-based Hudson's Bay Company announced that it will buy Saks, Inc. for US$2.4 billion. Through this ownership, Saks Fifth Avenue and Saks Fifth Avenue Off 5th became affiliated with Hudson's Bay, Home Outfitters, and Lord & Taylor.

List of department stores

References

External links 
 

American companies established in 1919
Companies based in New York City
Companies formerly listed on the New York Stock Exchange
Holding companies established in 1919
Holding companies of the United States
Hudson's Bay Company
Retail companies established in 1919
Saks Fifth Avenue
1919 establishments in Alabama
2013 mergers and acquisitions